Rainer Henkel (born 27 February 1964 in Opladen) is a former freestyle swimmer from Germany, who won the bronze medal in the 4×200 m freestyle relay for West Germany at the 1988 Summer Olympics in Seoul.

At the World Championships Henkel won four medals: two golds in the 400 m freestyle and 1500 m freestyle in 1986, silver in the 4×200 m freestyle, and bronze in the 4×200 m freestyle. Furthermore, he won five medals at the European Championships: two golds in the 1500 m freestyle and 4×200 m freestyle in 1987, two silver medals in the 1500 m freestyle in 1985 and the 400 m freestyle in 1987, and one bronze in the 400 m freestyle in 1985.

From 1989 to 2001 he was married to the former German high jumper Heike Henkel.

References

1964 births
Living people
Sportspeople from Leverkusen
Swimmers at the 1984 Summer Olympics
Swimmers at the 1988 Summer Olympics
Olympic bronze medalists for West Germany
Olympic swimmers of Germany
World record setters in swimming
Olympic bronze medalists in swimming
German male freestyle swimmers
World Aquatics Championships medalists in swimming
European Aquatics Championships medalists in swimming
Medalists at the 1988 Summer Olympics
20th-century German people
21st-century German people